BYU or Brigham Young University is a university in Provo, Utah, United States.

BYU may also refer to:
BYU Cougars, the university's athletic program
Bindlacher Berg Airport's IATA airport code
Buyang language's ISO-639 code
 Byu, short for "Bayou"; a Street suffix as used in the US

See also
Brigham Young University Jerusalem Center, a satellite campus in Jerusalem
Brigham Young University–Hawaii, a sister school in Laie, Hawaii, United States
Brigham Young University–Idaho, a sister school in Rexburg, Idaho, United States
BYU–Pathway Worldwide, an online education program accredited through Brigham Young University–Idaho